Nazish Pratapgarhi (born Mohammad Ahmad; 12 July 1924 – 10 April 1984)  was an  Urdu poet from India, who was known for his thoughts and ability to create contact between himself and lovers of Urdu poetry.

Early life

Pratapgarhi hailed from Pratapgarh, Uttar Pradesh, India.

Writings

He mainly wrote Urdu Ghazals. He was a disciple of Seemab Akbarabadi. His collection of ghazals titled Naya Saaz Naya Andaz was published by the Uttar Pradesh Urdu academy.  In 1983, he received the Ghalib Award in recognition of his contribution to Urdu literature.

He faced financial difficulties throughout his life and even when he approached the film industry, he did not sell his lyrics, although he led a poor life.

See also

 List of Indian poets
 List of Urdu language poets

References

1924 births
1981 deaths
Urdu-language poets from India
20th-century Indian poets
Indian male poets
Poets from Uttar Pradesh
20th-century Indian male writers
Recipients of Ghalib Award
People from Pratapgarh, Uttar Pradesh